Michael Lacey (1930 - December 1967) was an Irish hurler who played as a right wing-back for club side Cappoquin and at inter-county level with the Waterford senior hurling team.

Honours

Cappoquin
Waterford Junior Hurling Championship (1): 1948

Waterford
All-Ireland Senior Hurling Championship (1): 1959
Munster Senior Hurling Championship (2): 1957, 1959

References

1931 births
Living people
Waterford inter-county hurlers